Turibius or Toribius is the name of several saints:
Turibius of Astorga (died 460), Spanish bishop
Turibius of Liébana (fl. c. 527), Spanish monk
Turibius of Mogrovejo (died 1606), Spanish nobleman, inquisitor, missionary, and archbishop

See also
 Toribio (disambiguation)